Government Model Boys Higher Secondary School is a residential school in Thevally, Kollam. This school is affiliated to Kerala State Board of Education and is one of the oldest schools in Kollam district.

History
In 1834, the school was opened as His Highness Maharaja's English School at Thevally as a feeder primary school for the secondary school in the capital under an initiative led by Maharaja Swathi Thirunal Rama Varma of Travancore.

Facilities
There are separate buildings for Primary Division, High school division, Higher Secondary, Vocational Higher Secondary Divisions and residential buildings which works as hostel for students from other districts. High school and Higher secondary divisions have separate Computer Labs and Hostel facilities. Broadband internet connections are available in this labs. There is also a Sasthraposhini Lab for Physics, Chemistry and Biology.

Notable alumni
A.A. Rahim
Adoor Bhasi
C. Keshavan
Eugene Pandala
Jayan
Kadavoor Sivadasan
Malayatoor Ramakrishnan

References

External links
Schoolwiki
 Department of higher secondary education, Kerala 

High schools and secondary schools in Kerala
1834 establishments in India